Pholidoscelis wetmorei is a species of lizard in the family Teiidae (whiptails). The species is endemic to Puerto Rico. Its common names include the Puerto Rican blue-tailed ameiva, Wetmore's ameiva, and blue-tailed ground lizard.

Etymology
The specific name, wetmorei, is in honor of American ornithologist Alexander Wetmore.

Geographic range and habitat
In Puerto Rico Pholidoscelis wetmorei occurs in the southwestern dry coastal forests and adjacent islets including Caja de Muertos and Isla Magueyes.

Similar species
P. wetmorei can be distinguished from P. exsul (Puerto Rican ground lizard) found throughout the Puerto Rican Bank by its much smaller size. It is more abundant and outcompetes Pholidoscelis exsul in the dry forest where their ranges overlap. Juvenile Puerto Rican ground lizards have a similar bright blue tail that is lost with age; the blue tail remains in both adult and juvenile blue-tailed ground lizards.

Description
It is black overall with a creamy white to coppery red stomach. There are 7–9 tan or brown stripes extending from the head to the tail. The tail is one of the most distinctive traits of P. wetmorei. It is a bright turquoise blue or green, the color fully encircling the tail.

Biology
The blue-tailed ground lizard is xerophilic and diurnal. It is commonly found under rocks and logs, being most active during the heat of the day. The female can carry up to three eggs, and lay at least two clutches of one egg each per year. Ground lizards forage for insects and small fruits.

Threats
The principal threats to the blue-tailed ground lizard are predation and habitat loss. The species only occurs across the dry forests of southwestern Puerto Rico; accordingly, this habitat specialist requires very hot and dry climates to metabolize food and remain active throughout the day. Introduced mammals including small cats and mongooses affect this animal's populations.

References

Further reading
Goicoechea N, Frost DR, De la Riva I, Pellegrino KCM, Sites J Jr, Rodrigues MT, Padial JM (2016). "Molecular systematics of teioid lizards (Teioidea/Gymnophtalmoidea: Squamata) based on the analysis of 48 loci under tree-alignment and similarity-alignment". Cladistics 32 (6): 624–671. (Pholidoscelis wetmorei, new combination).
Schwartz A, Thomas R (1975). A Check-list of West Indian Amphibians and Reptiles. Carnegie Museum of Natural History Special Publication No. 1. Pittsburgh, Pennsylvania: Carnegie Museum of Natural History. 216 pp. (Ameiva wetmorei, p. 64).
Stejneger L (1913). "A New Lizard from Porto Rico". Proceedings of the Biological Society of Washington 26: 69-71. (Ameiva wetmorei, new species).

Reptiles of Puerto Rico
wetmorei
Reptiles described in 1913
Taxa named by Leonhard Stejneger